Belgium will compete at the 2022 European Championships in Munich from August 11 to August 22, 2022.

Medallists

Competitors
The following is the list of number of competitors in the Championships:

Athletics

Canoe Sprint

Men

Women

 X = Eliminated SF = Qualified for Semi-finals FA = Qualified for Final A

Cycling

Road

Men

Women

Track

Elimination race

Keirin

SF  = Qualified for Semifinals F1-6 = Qualified for Final 1st - 6th

Madison

Omnium

QF = Qualified for Finals

Points race

Pursuit

Scratch

Sprint

NR = National record

Time trial

Mountain bike

Men

Women

Gymnastics

Belgium has entered five male and five female athletes.

Men

Team & Individual All-around Finals

Individual Apparatus Finals

Women

Team & Individual All-around Finals

Individual Apparatus Finals

Rowing

Men

R = Qualified for Repechage SA/B = Qualified for Semifinal A/B FB = Qualified for Final B

Sport climbing

Boulder

Combined

Lead

Table tennis

Belgium entered 4 men and 1 woman.

Men

Women

Mixed

Triathlon

Men

Women

Mixed

References

2022
Nations at the 2022 European Championships
European Championships